Arcobara  (previously identified as Arcobadara ) was a fort in the Roman province of Dacia in the 2nd and 3rd centuries AD. It was unearthed in the village Ilişua (commune Uriu, Romania) in 1978.
The fort was edified by Ala I Tungrorum Frontoniana. On the site a significant number of ballista projectiles were discovered: 27 stone projectiles having diameter between 7 and 13.5 cm and weigh up to 2 kg. The artillery was used as defensive, probably located in the fort's towers. These artifacts indicates the presence of ballistarii in this fort.

See also
List of castra

External links
Roman castra from Romania - Google Maps / Earth

Notes

Roman legionary fortresses in Romania
Ancient history of Transylvania
Historic monuments in Bistrița-Năsăud County